Freedom Flight may refer to:

 Freedom Flight (Marty Balin album), 1997 
 Freedom Flight (Shuggie Otis album), 1971
 Freedom Flights US sponsored air-lift part of American resettlement program offering alien resident status to Cuban exiles 1965–1974.